Occipital sulcus may refer to:

 Lateral occipital sulcus
 Parieto-occipital sulcus
 Transverse occipital sulcus